Bahrain competed at the 2022 World Games held in Birmingham, United States from 7 to 17 July 2022. Athletes representing Bahrain won one silver medal and the country finished in 63rd place in the medal table.

Medalists

Competitors
The following is the list of number of competitors in the Games.

Cue sports

Bahrain competed in cue sports.

Duathlon

Bahrain competed in duathlon.

Ju-jitsu

Bahrain won one silver medal in ju-jitsu.

References

Nations at the 2022 World Games
World Games
World Games